Lukas Fankhauser is a Swiss curler.

At the national level, he is a Swiss men's champion curler (1990).

Teams

References

External links
 
 

Living people
Swiss male curlers
Swiss curling champions
Date of birth missing (living people)
Place of birth missing (living people)
Year of birth missing (living people)